{{Speciesbox
|taxon=Stenocereus queretaroensis
|authority=(F.A.C. Weber) Buxbaum
|image=Glandulicereus queretaroensis.jpg
|synonyms =*Cereus quertaroensis
Pachycereus queretaroensis
Lemaireocereus queretaroensis
Ritterocereus queretaroensis
Rathbunia queretaroensis'
}}Stenocereus queretaroensis'' is a species of cactus from Mexico, including the state of Querétaro. It is cultivated for its fruit.

References

Cacti of Mexico
Flora of Mexico
queretaroensis